Maren Costa is an American user experience designer and environmentalist. She is known for co-founding Amazon Employees For Climate Justice and for being illegally terminated by her former employer, Amazon. She is a principal designer at Microsoft.

Education 
Costa has Bachelor of Arts degree from St. Olaf College.

Career and activism 
Costa joined Amazon in 2002 at the Seattle headquarters. Costa said it was exciting to be at Amazon in the early years, but described the culture as "intense" with a heavy rate of corporate employee turnover due to excessive firings. She said her therapist asked her if she was in a social experiment after she got pregnant and suggested she may have been the first employee in her organization to have a child. She quit in 2011 due to what she believed was an incompatibility between the culture and having two young children. She re-joined the company in 2014 and eventually was promoted into a principal user experience design role.

Toward the end of 2018, Costa joined Emily Cunningham, a former Amazon user experience designer, in a climate change initiative Amazon employee-led shareholder proposal. In early 2019, the company met with Costa, Cunningham, and additional employees referring to themselves as Amazon Employees For Climate Justice to discuss the proposal, later announcing a carbon offset plan. The company requested the employees withdraw their proposal. After giving a quote to the press about the initiative, Costa was warned by the company that she had violated the company's policies involving "external communications" and threatened that repeated occurrences would result in termination.

On April 11, 2020, Costa was discharged by Amazon after she had amplified an initiative led by Cunningham to organize employees involving concerns about warehouse workplace conditions involving the COVID-19 pandemic and tweeting that she would match donations to organizing employees in the group Amazonians United. Costa filed a charge with the National Labor Relations Board (NLRB) and the agency found that Costa's firing was unlawful. Amazon maintained the termination was not a violation, but agreed to a settlement involving lost wages. Amazon was also required to post notices clarifying employee rights involving employee organizing in offices and warehouses.

In 2021, Costa announced on LinkedIn she was joining Microsoft as principal lead designer.

Costa has 9 patents pending.

Personal life 
Costa is divorced and has two children.

See also 
 Abigail Borah
 Nicole Hernandez Hammer
 Julia Butterfly Hill

References

External links 
 
 
 

Living people
Amazon (company) people
American designers
American environmentalists
American whistleblowers
Microsoft people
People from Seattle
St. Olaf College alumni
Year of birth missing (living people)